The City of Hamilton was a local government area about  west of Melbourne, the state capital of Victoria, Australia. Its area was surrounded by the Shire of Dundas.

History

Hamilton was first incorporated as a municipal district on 1 November 1859. It became a borough on 11 September 1863, and a town on 28 March 1928. It was proclaimed as a city on 22 November 1949.

On 23 September 1994, the City of Hamilton was abolished, and along with the Shire of Wannon and parts of the Shires of Dundas and Mount Rouse, was merged into the newly created Shire of Southern Grampians.

Wards
The City of Hamilton was not subdivided into wards, and its nine councillors represented the entire area.

Population

* Estimate in the 1958 Victorian Year Book.

Gallery

References

External links
 Victorian Places - Hamilton

Hamilton City